Mall Road may refer to:

 Mall Road, Lahore
 Mall Road, Shimla
 Mall Road, Manali